"Minor Swing" is a gypsy jazz tune composed by Django Reinhardt and Stéphane Grappelli. It was recorded by The Quintet of the Hot Club of France in 1937. It was recorded five other times throughout Reinhardt's career and is considered to be one of his signature compositions.

The composition was first released as a 78 single by Swing in 1937 with Django Reinhardt and Stéphane Grappelli in the Quintette du Hot Club de France.

The song appears in the 2002 video game Mafia: The City of Lost Heaven as the theme song of the fictional New Ark district within the game.

Structure
Minor Swing is written in the key of A minor. Apart from the brief introduction and final coda or playout, there is no discernable melody, just a repeated sequence of chord changes over which the key players improvise continuously until by some mutual agreement the end is decided and the playout performed. The introduction comprises a set of partial arpeggios over the chords Am/Dm/Am/Dm/Am/Dm/E7, followed by the main changes which are Am/-/Dm/-/E7/-/Am/-/ which are followed by Dm/-/Am/-/E7/-/Am/E7/, then the cycle begins again, until the playout which comprises some set arpeggios following the pattern of the first half of the tune with one repeat. In some modern treatments, the E7 in the middle of the second stanza may be replaced with Bb7 (a tritone substitution) and/or the second stanza sometimes replaced with a cycle of fifths based treatment for effect, i.e. Dm7/G7/Cmaj7/Fmaj7/Bø/E7/Am (etc.). Although the chord changes may appear unremarkable and the entire structure somewhat repetitive, in live performance it is a well known vehicle which permits the soloist or soloists to demonstrate their virtuosity and musical skill for creating interesting melodic and rhythmic excursions over the familiar chord patterns, as well as the opportunity to quote from Django's own recorded melodic inventions over his own tune.

Recordings
The discography section of Charles Delaunay's Django Reinhardt biography lists the following sessions at which versions of "Minor Swing" were recorded:
Paris, 25 November 1937: Django Reinhardt, guitar; Stéphane Grappelli, violin; Joseph Reinhardt & Eugène Vées, rhythm guitars; Louis Vola, double bass
Paris, March 1947: Django Reinhardt, guitar; Eddie Bernard, piano (French Radio broadcast; as "No Name Blues")
Paris, 29 August 1947: Django Reinhardt, guitar; Maurice Mernier, clarinet; Eugène Vées, rhythm guitar; Emmanuel Soudieux, double bass; André Jourdan, drums
Brussels, December 1948: Django Reinhardt, guitar; Hubert Rostaing, clarinet; Henri "Lousson" Baumgartner, rhythm guitar; Louis Vola, double bass; Arthur Motta, drums
Rome, January/February 1949: Django Reinhardt, guitar; Stéphane Grappelli, violin; Gianni Safred, piano; Carlo Pecori, double bass; Aurelio de Carolis, drums
Rome, April–May 1950: Django Reinhardt, guitar; André Ekyan, clarinet; Raph Schecroun, piano; Alf Masselier, double bass; Roger Paraboschi, drums

References

Instrumentals
1937 compositions
1930s jazz standards
Swing music
1937 songs

External links 
 1937 Recording